Mukhra Thuthai Haphong is a significant border peak of Bangladesh, situated in the southern part of Belaichori of Rangamati Hill District.
In April 2013, Fahim Hasan of BD Explorer summitted and measured this peak for the first time. The name of the peak was collected by BD Explorer and confirmed by the local tribal people of Dhupanichora village. The name Mukhra Thuthai Haphong came from the Tripura language. Nearest settlement is known as Dhupanichora para. The easiest route to summit this peak is to start from Ruma of Bandarban district.

See also
 Geography of Bangladesh
 List of countries by highest point
 List of mountains of Bangladesh

External links
 https://web.archive.org/web/20180201145135/http://www.panoramio.com/user/6710203
 http://www.wikiloc.com/wikiloc/user.do?name=BD+Explorer&id=605439

References

Mountains of Bangladesh